Chrysoclista thrypsiphila is a moth of the family Agonoxenidae. It was described by Edward Meyrick in 1912. It is found in Sri Lanka.

References

Moths described in 1912
Agonoxeninae
Moths of Asia